Batangas's 4th congressional district is one of the six congressional districts of the Philippines in the province of Batangas. It has been represented in the House of Representatives of the Philippines since 1987. The district consists of the eastern Batangas municipalities of Ibaan, Padre Garcia, Rosario, San Jose, San Juan, and Taysan. It is currently represented in the 19th Congress by Lianda B. Bolilia of the Nacionalista Party (NP).

Representation history

Election results

2022

2019

2016

2013

2010

2007

See also 
 Legislative districts of Batangas

References 

Congressional districts of the Philippines
Politics of Batangas
1907 establishments in the Philippines
Congressional districts of Calabarzon
Constituencies established in 1987